Gressoney-Saint-Jean (Gressoney ;) is a town and comune in the Aosta Valley region of north-western Italy.

Geography
The town is situated in a valley formed by the torrent Lys which is fed by the Lys glacier.

History, Walser culture and language 

In 1868, the Lys flooded the village.

From 1928 until 1946 the two were united into one commune, officially named Gressoney, which from 1939 onward was Italianized as Gressonei. After WWII, the two former communes were reconstituted.

An example of Greschòneytitsch:

Points of interest 
 Savoy Castle, a former summer residence of the House of Savoy
 Savoy Castle Alpine Botanical Garden, an alpine botanical garden within the grounds of Savoy Castle
 Villa Margherita, a former nobles' residence and currently the town hall

References

External links
Gressoney-Saint-Jean Tourist information www.gressoneyonline.it (Italian), retrieved 9 August 2017

Cities and towns in Aosta Valley
Ski areas and resorts in Italy